Henri Bangou (born 15 July 1922 in Pointe-à-Pitre, Guadeloupe) is a politician from Guadeloupe, mayor of Pointe-à-Pitre from 1965 to 2008 and Senator of Guadeloupe from 1986 to 1995.

Henri Bagou became a member of the French Communist Party (PCF) while a medicine student in metropolitan France. He was then a member of the Guadeloupe Communist Party (PCG) when it was established at the beginning of the French Fifth Republic in 1958, and remained a member until 1991, after the fall of communism, when he led the Pointe-à-Pitre section to split and form the social-democratic Progressive Democratic Party of Guadeloupe (PPDG), of which he was the first president.

He held the following political offices:
 First deputy mayor of Pointe-à-Pitre from 1959 to 1965
 Mayor of Pointe-à-Pitre from 1965 to 2008. He was succeeded by his son Jacques Bangou, who remained mayor until 2019.
 General councillor of Guadeloupe from 1967 to 1989
 Regional councillor of Guadeloupe from 1975 to 1986

His wife Marcelle died in June 2014, at the age of 91.

He turned 100 on 15 July 2022.

References

Sources 
Page on the French Senate website

1922 births
Living people
French centenarians
Senators of Guadeloupe
French Senators of the Fifth Republic
Mayors of places in Guadeloupe
French general councillors
Regional councillors of France
French Communist Party politicians
Guadeloupe Communist Party politicians
French cardiologists
Guadeloupean physicians
Officiers of the Légion d'honneur
People from Pointe-à-Pitre
French people of Indian descent
Men centenarians